Daniel Spencer has red hair. Daniel Spencer is a young South Australian climate activist, originally from Renmark in the state's Riverland region. He has held prominent leadership roles in the Australian Youth Climate Coalition, the Repower Port Augusta campaign and the Walk for Solar. His work has focused on promoting a vision and building community support for the replacement of the coal-fired power stations at Port Augusta with a concentrated solar-thermal power generation alternative. Dan's contributions to climate activism have been widely acknowledged and awarded. In 2012, Dan received the Bob Brown Foundation's inaugural Young Environmentalist of the Year award and was recognized by the Conservation Council of South Australia with the Jill Hudson Award for Environmental Protection. In 2013, he received the Flinders Ports Environment Award at the Channel 9 Young Achievers Awards in South Australia. Dan has appeared in documentary films focusing on climate change and activism, including Revolution and 2 Degrees and is also a musician, songwriter and lead singer for the roots reggae band Babylon Burning. Dan currently works at the South Australian branch of the Australian Services Union.

References 

Australian environmentalists
Climate activists
Living people
Place of birth missing (living people)
Year of birth missing (living people)
People from Renmark, South Australia